Sportpark Westvliet is a multi-sports park in Voorburg, Netherlands. Among others, it contains the grounds of VV Wilhelmus and the Voorburg Cricket Club.

Cricket 
The first recorded match on the ground came in 2010 when Afghanistan played Scotland in a warm-up match for the 2010 World Cricket League Division One, which the Netherlands hosted.  Despite having a boundary which is too short on one side, which is contrary to International Cricket Council regulation, the ground was nevertheless approved to hold One Day Internationals during the World Cricket League tournament.  The first One Day International saw Afghanistan play Canada. Three further One Day Internationals were played there, however a further two matches were scheduled to be held there but were moved due to the pitch being deemed unsatisfactory.  One Day International cricket returned to the ground in 2011 when the Netherlands played Kenya in the 2011-13 ICC Intercontinental Cup One-Day.

The ground is used by Voorburg Cricket Club, who previously played at Sportpark Duivesteijn and moved grounds in 2006, first playing at a reserve ground, before moving to Sportpark Westvliet in 2007.

International Cricket Centuries

One Day International Centuries 
The following table summarises the One Day International centuries scored at Sportpark Westvliet

T20 International Centuries 
The following table summarises the T20 International centuries scored at Sportpark Westvliet

References

External links
Sportpark Westvliet at ESPNcricinfo
Sportpark Westvliet at CricketArchive

Cricket grounds in the Netherlands
Sports venues in Leidschendam-Voorburg